Pope Clement XIII (r. 1758–1769) created 52 cardinals in seven consistories.

September 11, 1758

 Carlo Rezzonico

October 2, 1758

 Antonio Marino Priuli
 François-Joachim de Pierre de Bernis

September 24, 1759

 Ferdinando Maria de Rossi
 Ignazio Michele Crivelli
 Ludovico Merlini
 Filippo Acciaioli
 Luigi Gualterio
 Girolamo Spinola
 Antonio Maria Erba-Odescalchi
 Sante Veronese
 Ludovico Valenti
 Giuseppe Maria Castelli
 Pietro Francesco Bussi
 Gaetano Fantuzzi
 Giuseppe Agostino Orsi
 Pietro Girolamo Guglielmi
 Giuseppe Alessandro Furietti
 Pietro Paolo Conti
 Nicolò Maria Antonelli
 Lorenzo Ganganelli
 Giovanni Costanzo Caracciolo
 Niccolò Perelli
 Marcantonio Colonna
 Andrea Corsini

November 23, 1761

 Buenaventura de Córdoba Espínola de la Cerda
 Christoph Anton Migazzi
 Antoine Clériadus de Choiseul-Beaupré
 Jean-François-Joseph de Rochechouart
 Franz Christoph von Hutten
 Enrichetto Virginio Natta
 Giovanni Molino
 Louis Constantin de Rohan
 Baldassare Cenci (iuniore)

July 18, 1763

 Simone Buonaccorsi
 Andrea Negroni

July 21, 1766

 Giovanni Ottavio Bufalini
 Giovanni Carlo Boschi

September 26, 1766

 Ludovico Calini
 Niccolò Serra
 Niccolò Oddi
 Antonio Branciforte Colonna
 Lazzaro Opizio Pallavicini
 Vitaliano Borromeo
 Pietro Colonna Pamphili
 Giuseppe Simonetti
 Urbano Paracciani
 Filippo Maria Pirelli
 Enea Silvio Piccolomini
 Saverio Canali
 Benedetto Veterani

References

Clement XIII
College of Cardinals
18th-century Catholicism